Botetourt may refer to:
Baron Botetourt, an English noble title, and its holders
Botetourt County, Virginia, United States
USS Botetourt, built 1944